Freestone Point Confederate Battery is a historic American Civil War gun emplacement located at Leesylvania State Park, Woodbridge, Prince William County, Virginia. The battery has four individual gun emplacements, which are fairly simple in configuration. All are formed by a large, deep, rectangular depression with high earthen berms built
up on the north and south side of each depression.  Three of the batteries are located on the cliff about 90 feet above the Potomac River. For five months, from October 1861 to March 1862, the batteries contributed to the Confederate military's success in blockading the Potomac River.

It was listed on the National Register of Historic Places in 1989.

Gallery

References

American Civil War forts in Virginia
Buildings and structures in Prince William County, Virginia
National Register of Historic Places in Prince William County, Virginia
Forts on the National Register of Historic Places in Virginia
1861 establishments in Virginia
American Civil War on the National Register of Historic Places